Milligan University is a private Christian university in Milligan College, Tennessee.  Founded in 1866 as the Buffalo Male and Female Institute, and known as Milligan College from 1881 to May 2020, the school has a student population of more than 1,300 students, most of whom reside and study on its  campus. Milligan University is historically related to the Restoration Movement, with about 25% of the student body coming from the three main branches of that movement (Christian Churches/Churches of Christ, the Christian Church (Disciples of Christ), and the a cappella Churches of Christ). The university offers over 100 programs of study leading to both undergraduate and graduate degrees.

History
The school began as an endeavor of the Rev. Wilson G. Barker, a Disciples of Christ minister, and the Buffalo Creek Christian Church, a congregation of the Disciples of Christ located on Buffalo Creek in Carter County, Tennessee.  While it began as a private secondary school known as the Buffalo Male and Female Institute, the institution was elevated to the collegiate level in 1881 with the arrival of the Rev. Dr. Josephus Hopwood and his wife Sarah LaRue Hopwood.  Hopwood, a Disciples of Christ minister, and educator came to the school with the understanding that it would become a liberal arts college to train leaders for Disciples of Christ churches and the communities of Appalachia.  The name was changed to Milligan College in 1881 in honor of Professor Robert Milligan, president and professor of Biblical Studies at the College of the Bible, Kentucky University (now Lexington Theological Seminary).  Hopwood continued to serve the school as president until 1903 when he left to found Virginia Christian College (now Lynchburg College) in Lynchburg, Virginia.  He returned for an interim presidency in 1915–1917.

Dr. Henry Derthick served from 1917 to 1940.

In 1943, Milligan became the only college in the nation to completely turn its facilities over to the Naval training programs.  The V-12 Navy College Training Program utilized the college's campus from 1943 to 1945.

The school resumed its civilian education programs in 1945, though facing a significant financial crisis.  The board of trustees called Dr. Dean E. Walker, a Disciples of Christ minister and educator, then professor at the seminary of Butler University (now Christian Theological Seminary), to become the college's president.  Walker's administration was marked by rapid growth, securing financial stability for the college, and the realization of regional accreditation for the college's academic programs through the Southern Association of Colleges and Schools. During Walker's tenure he also led the way in establishing Emmanuel Christian Seminary, a graduate theological seminary now located adjacent to the college's campus near Johnson City, which became one of the graduate schools of the college in 2014.

Donald Jeanes (Milligan Class of 1968), a minister and educator of the Christian Churches and Churches of Christ, became the fourteenth president of the college in 1997. He is a graduate of the college, holds a Master of Divinity (M.Div.) degree from neighboring Emmanuel School of Religion, and was granted an honorary doctoral degree by Milligan College. Jeanes announced his retirement effective July 15, 2011.  On March 18, 2011, the Board of Trustees appointed Dr. Bill Greer (Milligan Class of 1985) as the 15th president; Dr. Greer assumed leadership of the college on July 15, 2011.  Greer's appointment marks the first time in the college's existence that anyone other than a minister will have served as president.  Greer is an economist, scholar, and business leader who holds a Ph.D. in business and economics from the University of Tennessee and has taught at the college for more than 20 years.

In 2014, the college announced a complete reorganization of its academic programs into five schools of research and study:  a school of arts and humanities, the William B. Green School of Business and Technology, a school of science and allied health, a school of social sciences and education, and a school of Bible and ministry, which includes Emmanuel Christian Seminary.  The reorganization and expansion of the college's academic programs included not only the addition of a new engineering program and three new master's programs through the integration of the seminary but also the college's first doctoral program with the addition of the Doctor of Ministry degree through Emmanuel.  With the addition of a degree in engineering in 2016, Milligan became one of a select number of small liberal arts colleges to offer education in the field of engineering.  The college announced the addition of a second doctoral degree, the doctor of education (Ed.D.) in the fall of 2016.  By the summer of 2017, the school will offer over 100 academic programs leading to bachelor's, master's, and doctoral degrees.

In the spring of 2020, the university drew some scrutiny for its views of and actions related to gay and lesbian people after the university fired a professor for being in a same-sex relationship. This administrative decision was founded on a document drafted in 2015 detailing the administration's views on human sexuality.

Campus
The Elizabeth Leitner Gregory Center for the Liberal Arts, a center for performing arts, opened on January 16, 2008. It features a 300-seat theater, photography labs, and classrooms for use by the fine arts programs at the university.

Student life

As a church-related liberal arts university, Milligan remains closely aligned with the Christian Churches/Churches of Christ, a capella churches of Christ, and the Christian Church (Disciples of Christ), the three religious bodies that have traditionally supported the school. A campus ministry program and culture of service exist on campus. Alcohol and tobacco use are prohibited on campus. On August 1, 2019, the university changed its alcohol policy to allow students over the age of 21 to drink alcohol off campus.

The Milligan Stampede is Milligan University's student-run newspaper. It was founded in 1925. Its staff also operate a student-run broadcast news service and news website.

The 2021–22 student handbook states that sex outside of heterosexual marriage is against divine will.

Athletics

The Milligan athletic teams are called the Buffaloes. The university is a member of the National Association of Intercollegiate Athletics (NAIA), primarily competing in the Appalachian Athletic Conference (AAC) since the 2001–02 academic year.

Milligan competes in 29 intercollegiate varsity sports: Men's sports include baseball, basketball, bowling, cross country, cycling, eSports, golf, soccer, swimming, tennis, track & field, triathlon and volleyball; while women's sports include basketball, bowling, cheerleading, cross country, cycling, dance, eSports, flag football, golf, soccer, softball, swimming, tennis, track & field, triathlon and volleyball. Former sports included football and men's disc golf.

Notable people
 Buddy Bolding, baseball coach, Class of 1973
 Warren Eugene Brandon (1916–1977), painter and photographer
 David Davis, Class of 1991, U.S. Congressman from Tennessee District 1
 William G. Dever, Syro-Palestinian archaeologist
 Del Harris, basketball coach, Class of 1959
 Megan Jastrab, earned bronze medal in Women's Team Pursuit during 2020 Tokyo Olympics 
 Frank Knight, Class of 1911, American economist
 John Preston McConnell, ordained minister in the Christian Church, and was the founder and first president of Radford University; he also served as pastor of First Christian Church (Disciples of Christ) in Radford, Virginia, which is located just across the street from Radford University
 Francis Gary Powers, an American pilot whose U-2 spy plane was shot down while over the Soviet Union, causing the U-2 Crisis of 1960, Class of 1950
 Sonny Smith, basketball coach and commentator, Class of 1958
 Loren Stuckenbruck, Class of 1981, professor and scholar of Second Temple Judaism
 Alfred A. Taylor, Tennessee governor and congressional representative
 Robert Love Taylor, Tennessee governor and congressional representative

References

External links

 
 Official athletics website

 
Private universities and colleges in Tennessee
Universities and colleges affiliated with the Christian churches and churches of Christ
Education in Carter County, Tennessee
Johnson City, Tennessee
Educational institutions established in 1866
Universities and colleges accredited by the Southern Association of Colleges and Schools
Buildings and structures in Carter County, Tennessee
Elizabethton, Tennessee
Council for Christian Colleges and Universities
1866 establishments in Tennessee
Appalachian Athletic Conference schools